{{Automatic taxobox
| name               = Hypsiglena
| image              = Hypsiglena torquata jani.jpg
| image_caption      = Texas night snakeHypsiglena jani texana
| taxon              = Hypsiglena
| authority          = Cope, 1860
| synonyms = 
 Leptodeira (part) – Günther, 1860
 Pseudodipsas W. Peters, 1860
 Comastes Jan, 1863 <ref>Tanner WW (1944). "A Taxonomic Study of the Genus ' 'Hypsiglena ". Great Basin Naturalist 5 (3 & 4): 25-92.</ref>
 Eridiphas Leviton & W.W. Tanner, 1960
| range_map          = Hypsiglena torquata distribution.svg
| range_map_caption = 
}}Hypsiglena is a genus of small, rear-fanged, colubrid snakes commonly referred to as night snakes. The genus consists of nine species, and subspecies have been maintained pending further investigation.Mulcahy DG, Martínez-Gómez JE, Aguirre-León G, Cervantes-Pasqualli JA, Zug GR (2014).  "Rediscovery of an endemic vertebrate from the remote Islas Revillagigedo in the eastern Pacific Ocean: The Clarión Nightsnake, with conservation and systematic implications".  PLOS ONE 9 (5): e97682.

Species and subspecies
The following species and subspecies are recognized as being valid.Hypsiglena affinis Boulenger, 1894 Hypsiglena catalinae W.W. Tanner, 1966 - Santa Catalina night snakeHypsiglena chlorophaea Cope, 1860 - desert night snakeHypsiglena chlorophaea chlorophaea  Cope, 1860- Sonoran night snakeHypsiglena chlorophaea deserticola W.W. Tanner, 1966 - Great Basin night snakeHypsiglena chlorophaea loreala W.W. Tanner, 1944 - Mesa Verde night snakeHypsiglena chlorophaea tiburonensis W.W. Tanner, 1981 - Tiburón Island night snakeHypsiglena jani (Dugès, 1865) - Chihuahua night snakeHypsiglena jani jani (Dugès, 1865) -San Luis Potosi night snakeHypsiglena jani texana Stejneger, 1893 - Texas night snakeHypsiglena jani dunklei Taylor, 1938 - Tamaulipas night snakeHypsiglena ochrorhynchus Cope, 1860 - spotted night snakeHypsiglena ochrorhynchus baueri Zweifel, 1958 - Cedros Island night snakeHypsiglena ochrorhynchus gularis W.W. Tanner, 1954 - Isla Partida night snakeHypsiglena ochrorhynchus klauberi W.W. Tanner, 1944 - San Diego night snakeHypsiglena ochrorhynchus martinensis W.W. Tanner & Banta 1962 - San Martín Island night snakeHypsiglena ochrorhynchus nuchalata W.W. Tanner, 1943 - California night snakeHypsiglena ochrorhynchus ochrorhynchus Cope, 1860 -Cape night snakeHypsiglena ochrorhynchus tortugaensis W.W. Tanner, 1944 - Isla Tortuga night snakeHypsiglena ochrorhynchus venusta Mocquard, 1899 - Central Baja night snakeHypsiglena slevini W.W.Tanner, 1943 - Baja California night snakeHypsiglena tanzeri Dixon & Lieb, 1972 - Tanzer's night snakeHypsiglena torquata (Günther, 1860) - night snakeHypsiglena unaocularus W.W.Tanner, 1946 - Islas Revillagigedo night snakeNota bene: A binomial authority or trinomial authority in parentheses indicates that the species or subspecies was originally described in a genus other than Hypsiglena.

Geographic rangeHypsiglena are found throughout the southwestern and western United States, from Texas and Kansas, west to California, north to Washington, and south into Mexico, as well as on islands off the coasts of Mexico.

Habitat
The preferred habitat of night snakes is semiarid desert regions with rocky and sandy soils.

Description
They are slender-bodied with a flattened head, and have small eyes with vertical pupils. Their color varies depending on their locality, often matching the soil color of their native habitat. They occur in various shades of gray, and brown, with dark brown, gray or black blotches on the back and the sides. Many also have distinctive black markings on the neck region.

BehaviorHypsiglena are nocturnal and terrestrial.

Diet
The diet of night snakes consists primarily of lizards, but they will also consume smaller snakes, and amphibians.

Venom
The venom of Hypsiglena is not considered to be dangerous to humans.

References

Further reading
Cope ED (1860). "Catalogue of the Colubridæ in the Museum of the Academy of Natural Sciences of Philadelphia, with notes and descriptions of new species. Part 2". Proc. Acad. Nat. Sci. Philadelphia 12: 241–266. (Hypsiglena'', new genus, p. 246).

External links

Hypsiglena
Vertebrates of Mexico
Reptiles of the United States
Snake genera
Taxa named by Edward Drinker Cope